Anime Banzai is an annual three-day anime convention held during October at the Davis Conference Center in Layton, Utah. The name of the convention roughly comes from the Japanese word for "hooray". The convention is organized by Utah Anime Promotions and is run by a volunteer staff.

Programming
The convention typically features an AMV contest, arcade gaming, artist alley, board gaming, card gaming, cosplay contest, formal dance, karaoke, panel discussions, special guests, video games, vendors, and workshops.

History
Anime Banzai was founded by the Salt Lake Community College "End of the World" Japanese Animation Club in 2004. Over 600 people attended the first year, while the organizers were expecting less than 300 attendees. The convention was held at the Salt Lake Community College in the Student Center for two years, the Sheraton City Centre Hotel for three, until moving to the Davis Conference Center due to the convention's growth. The convention in 2010 brought $400,000 to the economy and signed a three-year contract with the Davis Conference Center. In 2011, the convention brought an estimated $350,000+ to the economy. The 2012 convention brought $491,000 to the economy and remained at the Davis Conference Center. The convention in 2013 signed an agreement to return to the Davis Conference Center until 2015.

Representatives of Anime Banzai, while commenting on articles discussing why Salt Lake City did not have a large comic con, have stated that the convention would like to (and most likely will) return to Salt Lake City. Problems include outgrowing most convention space in the area, outgrowing the Davis Conference Center, affordability of the Salt Palace, and they hoped a new venue will be built that can handle conventions like Anime Banzai. Anime Banzai 2020 was cancelled due to the COVID-19 pandemic.

Event history

References

External links
Anime Banzai Website

Anime conventions in the United States
Recurring events established in 2005
2005 establishments in Utah
Annual events in Utah
Festivals in Utah
Tourist attractions in Davis County, Utah
Conventions in Utah